Abdul Basith siddiqui was a captain of the India men's national volleyball team. He was a member of the team that won the bronze medal in the 1986 Seoul Asian games, beating Japan. He also represented India in Asian games of 1978 and 1982.

Basith was born in Hyderabad in 1959 and then died in 1991. He was awarded the Arjuna Award in 1989.

References

Telugu people
Indian men's volleyball players
Recipients of the Arjuna Award
Accidental deaths by electrocution
Year of birth missing
1991 deaths
Accidental deaths in India
Asian Games medalists in volleyball
Volleyball players at the 1986 Asian Games
Volleyball players from Hyderabad, India
Medalists at the 1986 Asian Games
Asian Games bronze medalists for India